David Matásek (born 14 February 1963) is a Czech actor and musician. He is known for being a stable cast member of the "Poets hexalogy", which includes the 1982 film How the World Is Losing Poets, and as the guitarist in the early 1990s punk bands Orlík and Hagen Baden.

Biography

Early life
David Matásek was born in Prague in 1963. His father, Petr Matásek, was a theatre set designer, and his mother, Jana Matásková, was a graphic designer. Matásek attended the Prague Conservatory, graduating in 1984.

Acting
Matásek's first film appearance was a supporting role in Dušan Klein's How the World Is Losing Poets (1982). He would go on to reprise the character in the latter five parts of the so-called "Poets hexalogy".

Between 1991 and 1995, he was engaged at Prague's National Theatre, and he subsequently worked at Divadlo Komedie. Since 2002, the actor has been a member of the National Theatre again.

Music
In 1988, Matásek, who plays guitar, co-founded the oi! punk group Orlík, together with Daniel Landa. The band released two studio albums and broke up in 1991. Matásek later played in Lou Fanánek Hagen's punk band Hagen Baden, until their breakup in 1993.

Personal life
Matásek's first wife was fellow musician Eva Turnová, who formerly played bass with The Plastic People of the Universe. His second wife, Simona, with whom he has one daughter, is a journalist and playwright. The actor also has a daughter and a son with his third wife, Kateřina. He is currently married, for the fourth time, to fashion blogger Eva Matásková, with whom he has one son.

Between 2012 and 2014, Matásek, along with ninety other people, was criminally prosecuted for alleged bribery in a driving license scam.

Discography

with Orlík
 Oi!  (1990)
 Demise  (1991)

with Hagen Baden
 Hagen Baden (1992)
 Ahoj kluci (1993)

Selected filmography

Film

Television

References

External links
 

1963 births
Living people
Czech guitarists
Male guitarists
Musicians from Prague
Czech male film actors
Czech male stage actors
Czech male television actors
Prague Conservatory alumni